Pyganodon grandis, the giant floater, is a species of freshwater mussel, an aquatic bivalve mollusk in the family Unionidae, the river mussels. This species is fast-growing, large, and has a short lifespan.

This species is native to the United States and southeastern Canada.

Original description (Say 1829): "Shell very large, subovate; disk unequally wrinkled and undulated transversely, dark yellowish brown; umbo elevated; beak slightly elevated, with generally, two or three small sinuous, acute undulations; hinge margin slightly arquated, sometimes nearly rectilinear, somewhat angulated at its anterior termination, thence the edge descends by a nearly rectilinear, or slightly concave line to the anterior margin, which is considerably narrowed; sinus of the hinge margin concave; posterior margin widely rounded; within white margined, particularly before, with dusky."

References
 Binney, W.G. 1858. The complete writings of Thomas Say on the conchology of the United States. Bailliere Publ. NY
 Haag, W. R. (2012). North American Freshwater Mussels: Natural History, Ecology, and Conservation. Cambridge University Press. 
 Say, T. 1829. Descriptions of some new terrestrial and fluviatile shells of North America. New Harmony Disseminator of Useful Knowledge, New Harmony, Indiana. (see the description also in Binney's summary of Say's writing, 1858). 

Molluscs of Canada
Molluscs of the United States
grandis
Bivalves described in 1829